Minuartia uniflora, the one-flower stitchwort, is a species of flowering plant in the family Caryophyllaceae. It is native to the Southeastern United States where it is primarily found in the Piedmont. Its preferred habitat is sandy or granitic rock outcrops.

The plants formerly referred to as Minuartia alabamensis have been shown to be a self-pollinating form of Minuartia uniflora that has arisen independently at various locations, and it is thus included under this species. Recent genetic evidence suggests that this species is best placed in the genus Mononeuria, although this classification has not been widely adopted.

This species is distinguished from the similar Minuartia glabra by having shorter leaves and petals that are not clawed.

References

uniflora